Farleton may refer to:

Farleton, Cumbria, England
Farleton, Lancashire, England